Henry de La Vaulx (1870–1930), was a balloonist, author, and cofounder of major French and international aeronautical associations.

Biography 
He was born in Bierville, France on April 2, 1870.

From March 1896 to May 1897 he stayed with native tribes in Patagonia, and later wrote a book about this experience.

In 1898, he co-founded the Aero Club of France with Ernest Archdeacon, Léon Serpollet, Henri de la Valette, Jules Verne, Honorine de Viane Morel Verne, André Michelin, Albert de Dion, Alberto Santos-Dumont, and Henry Deutsch de la Meurthe.

On Oct 9, 1900 he and a companion set a distance record in a balloon traveling 1200 miles from Vincennes to Korostyshiv near Kiev (Now Ukraine, then in Russia) in 35.75 hours.   Also in 1900 he received the Grand Medal of the Aero Club of France for exceptional contributions to the progress of aviation.

In 1905 he cofounded and became a director of the Fédération Aéronautique Internationale (FAI). The FAI now awards the De la Vaulx Medal, named for him.
He visited the United States several times for ballooning ventures and the New York Times described him as one of the "most successful and daring balloonists in the world."

He developed airships for the Zodiac company.

He published a dozen books, mostly on aviation.

He lived in the castle Rozoy-Bellevalle.

He died when a scheduled flight between Montreal, Canada and Newark, NJ that he was on collided with power lines on approach to Newark on April 18, 1930, and was buried in the Rozoy-Bellevalle cemetery.

Published works 

 Voyage en Patagonie ; ouvrage contenant quarante illustrations d’après les photographies de l’auteur, et une carte hors texte, Préf. José-Maria de Heredia, Paris, Hachette, 1901
 Les Anciens Habitants des rives du Colhué Huapi (Patagonie), Paris, Leroux, 1902
 La Montagne d'amour : tableau de la vie Araucane, [S.l.s.n.], 1902
 L’Emploi des ballons à ballonnet d’après la théorie du général Meusnier, Paris, Gauthier-Villars, 1903
 L’Aérostation, Paris, Larousse, 1906
 Le Tour du monde de deux gosses ; le chemin des nuages, Paris, Tallandier, 1908
 Le Triomphe de la navigation aérienne, Paris, Tallandier, 1911
 Les Vainqueurs de l’air ; histoire de l’aéronautique: ses débuts sportifs, son application militaire, sa réalisation commerciale, Paris, Hachette, 1921
 L’Aéronautique des origines à 1922, Paris, Floury, 1922
 Cent Mille Lieues dans les airs, Paris, Arthéme Fayard, 1925
 Joseph et Étienne de Montgolfier, Paris, Annonay, 1926
 Un Tour du monde en aéroplane, Paris, Albin Michel, 1930
 Bibliothèque de feu M. le comte Henry de La Vaulx, Paris, Bosse, 1930

Legacy
 His name was given to a Latécoère 28 famously flown across the South Atlantic by Jean Mermoz.

Naming and lexicography 

 He was often referred to as "comte de La Vaulx." Comte is a French title analogous to the British title "Count."
 His first name is sometimes written as Henri, the usual French spelling, but on the book cover at left, he used the spelling "Henry."
 His name is usually alphabetized as La Vaulx, Henry de.

References

External links
 

1870 births
1930 deaths
Aviation pioneers
Aviators killed in aviation accidents or incidents in the United States
Balloon flight record holders
French aviation record holders
French balloonists
Victims of aviation accidents or incidents in 1930